Cucullanus is a genus of parasitic nematodes. The genus includes more than 100 species.Petter, A. J., & Le Bel, J. (1992). Two new species in the genus Cucullanus (Nematoda-Cucullanidae) from the Australian Region. Memórias do Instituto Oswaldo Cruz, 87, 201-206. PDF   

Among the species, Cucullanus cirratus is a parasite of cod. Cucullanus genypteri is a parasite of the pink cusk-eel, Genypterus blacodes.

Two species known as C. pybusae and C. stelmoides'' were discovered in 1978 inhabiting the liver and intestines of the American brook lamprey.

References 

Ascaridida
Parasitic nematodes of fish
Rhabditida genera